Stakes Winner 2 is a horse racing arcade video game developed by Saurus, with additional support from System Vision, and originally published by SNK on September 24, 1996. It is the sequel to the original Stakes Winner, which was released earlier in 1995 on multiple platforms. In the game, players compete with either AI-controlled opponents or against other human players across multiple races. Though it was initially launched for the Neo Geo MVS (arcade), the title was later released to Neo Geo AES (home), in addition of being ported and re-released through download services for various consoles. Like its predecessor, it was received with mixed reception from critics and reviewers since its initial release. A third entry, Stakes Winner 3, was rumored to be in development but never released.

Gameplay 

Stakes Winner 2 is a thoroughbred horse racing game similar to its predecessor, where players take control of any of the available horses, each with their own strengths and weaknesses, to compete against either AI opponents or other human players across multiple races.

Players control their horse with the joystick while two action buttons are used; one controlling the reins for small accelerations that drains little portions of the horse's stamina and another for the whip for fast speed, which drastically consumes stamina from the horse and if the stamina is depleted completely, racing is given up for a short period. Two quick taps on the joystick at any direction allows the horse to push back an opponent in front of them, however two quick taps on the opposite side reduces speed. Power-ups also spawn on the race track for players to pick up. Failing to qualify for the next race results in a game over screen unless players insert more credits into the arcade machine to continue playing.

Development and release 
Stakes Winner 2 was developed by Saurus, with additional support from System Vision. The game was first released by SNK for the Neo Geo MVS on September 24, 1996, and was then published for Neo Geo AES on December 13 of the same year. The game was later ported by Saurus to the PlayStation and Sega Saturn, both of which were released in May 1997. It has since received multiple re-releases in recent years on various digital distribution platforms such as the Virtual Console, Nintendo eShop, PlayStation Network and Xbox Live.

Reception 

Stakes Winner 2 was met with mixed reception from critics and reviewers since its release. In Japan, Game Machine listed it on their November 1, 1996 issue as being the fourth most-successful arcade game of the month, outperforming titles such as Dancing Eyes, Street Fighter Alpha 2 and The King of Fighters '96.

Notes

References

External links 
 Stakes Winner 2 at GameFAQs
 Stakes Winner 2 at Killer List of Videogames
 Stakes Winner 2 at MobyGames

1996 video games
ACA Neo Geo games
Arcade video games
D4 Enterprise games
Head-to-head arcade video games
Horse racing video games
Multiplayer and single-player video games
Neo Geo games
Nintendo Switch games
PlayStation (console) games
PlayStation Network games
PlayStation 4 games
Racing video games
Saurus games
Sega Saturn games
SNK games
Virtual Console games
Windows games
Xbox One games
Video games developed in Japan
Hamster Corporation games